The 2013 Critérium International, was the 82nd running of the Critérium International cycling stage race.

Schedule

Stages

Stage 1
23 March 2013 – Porto-Vecchio to Porto-Vecchio,

Stage 2
23 March 2013 – Porto-Vecchio to Porto-Vecchio,  individual time trial (ITT)

Stage 3
24 March 2013 – Porto-Vecchio to Col de l'Ospedale,

Classification leadership

References

External links

Criterium International
2013 in French sport
Critérium International